The Queen's Birthday Honours 2001 was announced on 16 June 2001 for the United Kingdom (including Northern Ireland), New Zealand (4 June), Australia (11 June), Barbados, Bahamas, Grenada, Papua New Guinea, Solomon Islands, Tuvalu, Saint Lucia, Saint Vincent and The Grenadines, Belize and Saint Christopher and Nevis on the occasion of the celebration of Her Majesty's Birthday.

Recipients of honours are displayed as they were styled before their new honour. They are arranged by the country whose ministers advised Queen Elizabeth II on the appointments, honour, degree and where appropriate by division (i.e. Civil and Military). The order of precedence is determined by each individual realm.

United Kingdom

Knight Bachelor
Professor George Sayers Bain, President and Vice Chancellor, The Queen's University of Belfast. For services to Higher Education and to the Low Pay Commission.
Professor Anthony Edward Bottoms, Criminologist. For services to the Criminal Justice System.
Percy James Butler, C.B.E., D.L. For charitable services, especially in Hampshire.
Neil Robert Chalmers, Director, The Natural History Museum. For services to Museums.
William Frederick Cotton, C.B.E., Chairman, Meridian Broadcasting. For services to Television Broadcasting and to Marie Curie Cancer Care.
Donald Thomas Younger Curry, C.B.E., Chairman, Meat and Livestock Commission. For services to the Meat and Livestock Industries.
Graham Martin Doughty, Leader, Derbyshire County Council. For services to Local Government.
Joseph Anthony Dwyer, President, Institution of Civil Engineers. For services to Liverpool Vision.
Terence (Terry) Farrell, C.B.E., Architect. For services to Architecture and Urban Design.
James Galway, O.B.E. For services to music.
Christopher Charles Gent, Chief Executive, Vodafone Group plc. For services to the Mobile Telecommunications Industry.
Professor Robert Brian Heap, C.B.E., F.R.S. For services to Reproductive Biology and to International Science.
Peter James Denton Job, Chief Executive, Reuters plc. For services to the Information and Media Industry.
Professor John Andrew Likierman, Managing Director, Financial Management, Reporting and Audit, H.M. Treasury.
Michael Nicholson Lord, Second Deputy Chairman of Ways and Means and a Deputy Speaker. For services to Parliament.
Frank Budge Lowe. For services to the Advertising Industry and for charitable services.
Professor Donald Neil MacCormick, M.E.P., Q.C., Regius Professor of Public Law, University of Edinburgh. For services to Scholarship in Law.
Terence Hedley Matthews, O.B.E. For services to Industry and to Wales.
Ian Mills, lately Regional Chairman, NHS Executive, London Regional Office. For services to the NHS.
Robert Ogden, C.B.E., Chairman, Ogden Group of Companies. For charitable services in Yorkshire.
Keith Povey, Q.P.M., H.M. Inspector of Constabulary. For services to the Police.
Kevin Joseph Satchwell, Headteacher, Thomas Telford School, Shropshire. For services to Education.
John Young Stewart, O.B.E. For services to Motor Racing.
Peter Vardy, Chairman, Reg Vardy plc. For services to Business and to Education in North East England.
Robert Brian Williamson, C.B.E., Chairman, LIFFE. For services to the Financial Services Industry.
Professor Alan Geoffrey Wilson, Vice Chancellor, University of Leeds. For services to Higher Education.

Order of the Bath

Knight Commander of the Order of the Bath (KCB)
Military Division
Vice Admiral Peter Spencer.
Lieutenant General Anthony David Pigott, C.B.E., late Corps of Royal Engineers.

Civil Division
William Robert McKay, C.B., Clerk of the House of Commons.
Nicholas Lionel John Montagu, C.B., Chairman, H.M. Board of Inland Revenue.
Joseph Grant Pilling, C.B., Permanent Secretary, Northern Ireland Office.
Muir Russell, Permanent Secretary, Scottish Executive.

Companion of the Order of the Bath (CB)
Military Division
Rear Admiral Jeremy Michael de Halpert.
Rear Admiral Iain Robert Henderson, C.B.E.
Major General Liam Diarmuid Curran, late Corps of Royal Electrical and Mechanical Engineers.
Major General Archibald Peter Neil Currie, late Royal Regiment of Artillery.
Major General Ashley Ernest George Truluck, C.B.E. (486759), late Royal Corps of Signals.
The Venerable The Archdeacon Anthony Peter Bishop, Q.H.C., Royal Air Force.
Air Vice-Marshal Thomas William Rimmer, O.B.E., Royal Air Force.

Civil Division
John Frederick Ballard, Director, Water and Land, Department of the Environment, Transport and the Regions.
Colin Victor Balmer, Principal Finance Officer, Ministry of Defence.
Miss Philippa Catherine Drew, Director, Education, Training, Arts and Sport, Department for Culture, Media and Sport.
Peter David Ewins, Chief Executive, Meteorological Office, Ministry of Defence.
David Clive Gowdy. For public service.
Michael Stephen Dreese Granatt, Head, Government Information and Communication Service, Cabinet Office.
Neil Stuart McKay, Chief Operating Officer, Department of Health.
Andrew Christie Normand, Crown Agent, Crown Office and Procurator Fiscal Service, Scottish Executive.
Peter Ray. Senior Civil Servant, Ministry of Defence.
David Maxwell Salisbury, Principal Medical Officer, Department of Health.
Stephen Wynn Boys Smith, Director General, Immigration and Nationality Directorate, Home Office.
Anita, Mrs Straker, O.B.E., Director, Key Stage 3 Strategy, Department for Education and Employment.
John McMaster Samuel Hugh Glenn Thompson, Director General, Northern Ireland Court Service, a Department of the Lord Chancellor.
Gerald David Wynn, Director of Operations, GCHQ.

Order of St Michael and St George

Knight Grand Cross of the Order of St Michael and St George (GCMG)
Sir John (Olav) Kerr, K.C.M.G., Head, H.M. Diplomatic Service.

Knight Commander of the Order of St Michael and St George (KCMG)
Graham Hugh Boyce, C.M.G., H.M. Ambassador, Cairo.
Richard Billing Dearlove, O.B.E., Chief, Secret Intelligence Service.
David Geoffrey Manning, C.M.G., Permanent Representative, UKDel, NATO.
Nicholas Vernon Scheele. For services to British Motor Exports.

Companion of the Order of St Michael and St George (CMG)
Anthony John Abbott, O.B.E., Governor, Montserrat.
Professor Michael Parker Banton, UN Committee for the Elimination of Racial Discrimination.
Paul Michael Barrett, O.B.E. For services to SmithKline Beecham and to Export.
Stuart Armitage Brooks, O.B.E., Counsellor, Foreign and Commonwealth Office.
Edward Paul Ronald Cautley. For services to British Business Interests Overseas.
David John Hall, Deputy Chief Executive, British Trade International.
Anthony Hamilton Millard Kirk-Greene, M.B.E. For services to the History of Africa.
David Charles Hartridge, lately Director, Services Division, World Trade Organization. For services to International Trade.
John Andrew Patrick Hill, C.B.E. For services to British Trade Overseas.
Peter Lawrence Hunt, lately H.M. Consul-General, Istanbul.
Gerard Anthony Lemos. For services to the British Council.
Peter Longworth, British High Commissioner, Harare.
Miss Kaye Wight Oliver, O.B.E., British High Commissioner, Maseru.
Professor Jonathan Dermot Spence. For services to the Study of Modern China.
Charles Richard Vernon Stagg, H.M. Ambassador, Sofia.
Selwyn Charles Cornelius Wheeler. For services to Broadcasting and Journalism Overseas.

Royal Victorian Order

Knight Grand Cross of the Royal Victorian Order (GCVO)
Major Sir Hew Fleetwood Hamilton-Dalrymple, Bt., K.C.V.O., Captain General, The Queen's Body Guard for Scotland, Royal Company of Archers and Gold Stick for Scotland.

Knight Commander of the Royal Victorian Order (KCVO)
Hugh Ashley Roberts, C.V.O., Director of the Royal Collection and Surveyor of The Queen's Works of Art.

Commander of the Royal Victorian Order (CVO)
The Reverend Professor Peter William Brunt, lately Physician to The Queen in Scotland.
Graham, Baron Kirkham, Chairman, Joint Funding Board, The Duke of Edinburgh's Award, and Trustee, Outward Bound Trust.

Lieutenant of the Royal Victorian Order (LVO)
The Honourable Peter Macleod Benson, lately Auditor, Ascot Authority.
Dr William Ronald Davey, lately Physician to The Queen.
William Peter Dwerryhouse. For Personal Services.
Dr Douglas James Allan Glass, Apothecary to the Household at Balmoral.
Mary, The Lady Nicholas Gordon Lennox, Lady in Waiting to Princess Alexandra, the Honourable Lady Ogilvy.
Ian Donald McGregor, Assistant Keeper of the Privy Purse.
Juliette Mary, Mrs Woolley, Director of Fundraising, The Duke of Edinburgh's Award.

Member of the Royal Victorian Order (MVO)
Nicholas Stewart Archer, lately Assistant Private Secretary to The Prince of Wales.
Martin David Clayton, Assistant Curator, Print Room, Royal Library, Windsor Castle.
Colonel David Wallace Cooper (Retired), lately Director of The Prince's Scottish Youth Business Trust.
Sergeant Robert Fulton, Royalty Protection Department, Metropolitan Police.
James Leonard Jackson, R.V.M.*, Armourer, Royal Collection.
John Hywel James, lately Volunteer, The Prince's Trust.
Miss Sarah Suttor Key, Physiotherapist.
Colin Francis McIntosh, President, Braemar Royal Highland Society.
Miss Joy Margaret Quested-Nowell, Milliner to Queen Elizabeth The Queen Mother.
Stephen Martin Pocklington, Head Teacher, Sandringham and West Newton School.
Sergeant Paul Adrian Ronald Ridout, Royalty Protection Department, Metropolitan Police.
Alan Peter Ryan, Assistant Property Manager, Buckingham Palace.
Sergeant James Leonard Scottow, lately Royalty Protection Department, Metropolitan Police.
Miss Mavis Gillian Shepheard, Assistant Clerk, Oxfordshire Lieutenancy.
John Gordon (Jack) Sinclair, lately Bandleader.
Miss Rosemarie Lynn Tart, Assistant Housekeeper, Buckingham Palace.
Miss Angela Jane Wise, Personal Assistant to the Deputy Secretary, Duchy of Cornwall.

Royal Victorian Medal

Royal Victorian Medal (Gold)
 Edward Andrew Dodd, R.V.M., lately Gatekeeper, Balmoral Castle.
 Michael Christopher Martin Sealey, R.V.M.*, Chef to Queen Elizabeth The Queen Mother.
 William John Stephenson Tallon, R.V.M.*, Steward to Queen Elizabeth The Queen Mother.

Bar to the Royal Victorian Medal (Silver)
Raymond Allington, R.V.M., Forestry Foreman, Sandringham Estate.
Frederick George Benefer, R.V.M., Fruit Farm Manager, Sandringham Estate.
Peter Colin Farrow, R.V.M., Lorry Driver, Sandringham Estate.
Trevor Mace, R.V.M., Plumber, Sandringham Estate.

Royal Victorian Medal (Silver)
George Benjamin Bell, Foreman, Property Section, Windsor Castle.
John Reginald Clist, lately Parks Worker, Crown Estate, Windsor.
Neil Cook, Ranger, Balmoral Estate.
George William Cross, Craftsman Fitter, Crown Estate, Windsor.
James Cecil Hadden, Principal Dresser to the Knights of the Thistle.
George Herbert Laming, Carpenter, Crown Estate, Windsor.
Allan David Masson, Mechanic, Balmoral Estate.
Robert David McLean, Caretaker, Duchy of Lancaster, Cockfosters.
Gordon Monteith, lately Gardener, Balmoral Estate.
Patrick Shovelin, lately Liveried Messenger, St James's Palace.
William John Sim, Farm Grieve, Balmoral Estate.
Dennis Tomlin, lately Yeoman Bed Goer, The Queen's Body Guard of the Yeomen of the Guard.
George Duncan Watt, Gamekeeper, Balmoral Estate.

Order of the Companions of Honour (CH)
Sir Colin Rex Davis, C.B.E., Principal Conductor, London Symphony Orchestra. For services to Music.

Order of the British Empire

Dame Commander of the Order of the British Empire (DBE)
Professor Ingrid Victoria Allen (Mrs Barnes Thompson), C.B.E., D.L. For services to Medical Research.
Miss Eileen Atkins (Mrs Shepherd), C.B.E., Actress and Writer. For services to Drama.
 Wendy Patricia, Mrs Davies, Headteacher, Selly Park Technology College for Girls, Birmingham. For services to Education.
Karlene Cecile, Mrs Davis, General Secretary, Royal College of Midwives. For services to Midwifery and to the NHS.
Professor Julia Stretton Higgins, C.B.E., F.R.S., Professor of Polymer Science, Imperial College London. For services to Science.
Miss Sheila Marshall McKechnie, O.B.E., Director, Consumers’ Association. For services to Consumers.
Professor Lesley Howard Rees, Director of Education, Royal College of Physicians. For services to Medical Education.
Dela, Mrs Smith, Headteacher, Beaumont Hill Special School, Darlington. For services to Education for Children with Special Educational Needs.
Professor Ann Marilyn Strathern, William Wyse Professor of Social Anthropology, University of Cambridge. For services to Social Anthropology.

Knight Commander of the Order of the British Empire (KBE)
The Honourable Dr Howard Archibald Fergus, C.B.E., Former Speaker, Legislative Council, Montserrat.
Air Marshal Roderick Harvey Goodall, C.B., C.B.E., A.F.C.*, Royal Air Force.
Jeffrey Russell James, C.M.G., British High Commissioner, Nairobi.

Commander of the Order of the British Empire (CBE)
Military Division
 Commodore Barry Andrew Louis Goldman. Royal Navy. 
 Commodore Fabian Henry Hiscock, OBE. Royal Navy. 
 Group Captain Brian James Jerstice. Royal Air Force. 
 Group Captain Peter Rennie Ollis. Royal Air Force. 
 Air Commodore Peter William David Ruddock. Royal Air Force. 
 Colonel Stephen Michael Andrews, MBE. Late Corps of Royal Electrical and Mechanical Engineers. 
 Colonel Edward Bradley Lawrence Armitstead, OBE. Late Coldstream Guards. 
 Colonel Anthony William King-Harman. Late Royal Regiment of Artillery. 
 Major-General Murray Leslie Wildman. Late Corps of Royal Electrical and Mechanical Engineers. 
Civilian Division
 Neville Abraham. Chairman, Groupe Chez Gerard. For services to the restaurant trade. 
 David Acland, DL. Lately chairman, Royal National Lifeboat Institution. For services to maritime safety.
 Mohammed Ajeeb. For services to Local Government in Bradford, West Yorkshire.
 Miss Ingrid Carol Alexander. Chairman, Central Council for Education and Training in Social Work. For services to health and social care. 
 James Andrews. Chief executive, Glasgow City Council. For services to Local Government in Scotland.
 Professor Elizabeth Nneka Anionwu. Head, Mary Seacole Centre for Nursing Practice, Thames Valley University. For services to nursing. 
 David Bailey. Photographer and film maker. For services to art.
 Professor Rajinder Singh Bhopal. Alexander Bruce and John Usher Professor of Public Health Medicine, University of Edinburgh. For services to public health medicine.
 David James Bills. Director general, Forestry Commission.
 David Julian Bintley. Director, Birmingham Royal Ballet. For services to dance.
 Ms Joan Blaney. Board Member, Birmingham and Solihull TEC. For services to the Community Champions Fund.
 Mrs Joyce Alice Bridges. Divisional manager, Urban Policy Unit, Department of the Environment, Transport and the Regions. 
 Walter Kenneth Brown. Principal, Liverpool Community College. For services to further education.
 Judge Neil McLaren Butter, QC. Senior Circuit Judge, Central London County Court. For services to the administration of justice. 
 William John Charles. For services to Association Football.
 David Johnson Cohen. Trustee, David Cohen Family Charitable Trust. For charitable services, especially to the arts. 
 John Kevin Conway. Principal, Greenhead College, Huddersfield, West Yorkshire. For services to further education. 
 Professor Cary Lynn Cooper. BUPA Professor of Organisational Psychology and Health, UMIST. For services to health and safety. 
 John Cornforth. Architectural Historian. For services to the Historic Built Environment.
 Mrs Paula Carolyn Diggle. Head of Savings and Pensions Policy, HM Board of Inland Revenue.
 James Thomson Donaldson. Lately chief inspector, Further Education Funding Council. For services to education. 
 Peter Brian Ellwood. Group chief executive, Lloyds TSB Group plc. For services to banking. 
 John Derek Evans. Chief Conciliator, ACAS, Department of Trade and Industry. 
 Ms Margaret Exley. Director, Towers Perrin. For services to management in the public sector. 
 Eric Watt Ferguson. Head of Parliamentary and Constitutional Division, Scotland Office.
 Professor Peter John Fleming. Professor of Infant Health and Development, University of Bristol. For services to the understanding of cot death. 
 John Stanton Flemming. Member, Royal Commission on Environmental Pollution. For services to Economics and to Environmental Protection. 
 Peter Freeman. For services to International Development.
 David Gilroy. Deputy chief inspector, Social Services Inspectorate, Department of Health.
 Stan Godfrey. Area director, Pensions and Overseas Benefits Directorate, Department of Social Security. 
 Felicity Margaret Sue Goodey, DL. Chairman, Lowry Trust. For services to the regeneration of Salford Quays.
 Professor Julian Mary Goodfellow. Professor, Biomolecular Science, Birkbeck College, University of London. For services to biophysics. 
 David Charles Green. Executive vice-president, Freight Transport Association. For services to transport.
 Raymond Jonathan Gubbay. Managing director, Raymond Gubbay Ltd. For services to music.
 Dennis George Gunn, QPM. Chief Constable, Cambridgeshire Constabulary. For services to the police.
 Professor Mark Peregrine Haggard. Director, MRC Institute of Hearing Research. For services to hearing research.
 John Keith Harding. Lately chief Probation Officer, Inner London Probation Service. For services to the Probation Service.
 The Rt Rev Robert Maynard Hardy. Bishop of Lincoln. For services to the Church of England, and to prisoners.
 Ms Nicola Harwin. For services to the Women's Aid Federation of England. 
 Ian James Henderson. Chief executive, Land Securities plc. For services to the property industry.
 Keith Ronald Hirst. Lately Chair, Sandwell TEC. For services to Education, Training and Enterprise in the Black Country. 
 Paul Richard Hodgkinson. Chief executive, Simons. For services to business. 
 Mrs Patricia Alayne Hughes. Lately chief executive, London Borough of Sutton. For services to Local Government.
 James Hunter. Chairman, Highlands and Islands Enterprise. For services to the Highlands and Islands. 
 Mrs Margaret Iles. Headteacher, St Mary's and St Peter's Primary School, Teddington, Surrey. For services to education. 
 Christopher Richard Ivory. Lately Chair, North Yorkshire TEC and Yorkshire and Humber TECs Ltd. For services to training.
 Jeffrey Louis Jay. Consultant Ophthalmologist, Tennent Institute of Ophthalmology, Gartnavel General Hospital, Glasgow. For services to Ophthalmology. 
 Miss Susan Linda Jennings. Director, National Patients Access Team. For services to the NHS.
 William Ian Ridley Johnston, QPM. Lately assistant commissioner, Metropolitan Police Service. For services to the police. 
 David Harold Jones. Lately chief executive, National Grid. For services to the electricity supply industry. 
 Professor Roger Mark Jowell. For services to the National Centre for Social Research.
 George Bernard Kessler. Lately deputy chair, LETEC and chairman, London TEC Council. For services to skills and business development. 
 Kenneth John Knight, QFSM. Chief Fire Officer, West Midlands Fire Service. For services to the Fire Service.
 Kevin Adrian Lasbury. Divisional director, Highways Agency, Department of the Environment, Transport and the Regions.
 Christopher Frank Carandini Lee. Actor. For services to drama.
 Christopher Gray Lewis. Head, Offenders and Corrections Unit, Research, Development and Statistics Directorate, Home Office. 
 Ms Shuna Taylor Lindsay. Leader, Airlift and Future Tanker Integrated Project Team, Ministry of Defence. 
 Alastair David Lyons. For services to the Department of Social Security. 
 Alasdair Uist Macdonald. Headteacher, Morpeth School, Tower Hamlets, London. For services to education.
 Douglas Marr. Headteacher, Banchory Academy. For services to secondary education in Scotland. 
 Michael Craig-Martin. Artist. For services to art.
 Mrs Judith McLaggan. Assistant director, HM Board of Inland Revenue.
 David Rogerson Mellor, OBE. Designer. For services to design and manufacturing. 
 Anthony Minghella. Writer and film director. For services to film drama.
 Professor Roger Michael Needham, FRS. Director, Cambridge Microsoft Research Laboratory. For services to computing. 
 Christopher John Nicholls. Headteacher, Moulsham High School, Chelmsford, Essex. For services to education. 
 Hugh Peden. Collector, HM Board of Customs and Excise.
 Roland John Phillips. Deputy head, Litigation Division, Treasury Solicitor's Department.
 Professor Michael Isaac Podro. Emeritus Professor of Art History and Theory, University of Essex. For services to art history.
 Nicholas Martin Prest. Chairman and chief executive, Alvis plc. For services to the defence industry.
 Anthony Francis Pryor. Chairman, Devonport Management Ltd. For services to the defence industry.
 Professor William Graham Richards. Chairman of Chemistry, University of Oxford. For services to chemistry.
 Jonathan Rickford. Lately project director, Company Law Review. For services to business.
 John Richard Rivers. Chair, Southern Derbyshire Employer Coalition. For services to the New Deal.
 Peter Rogers. Lately chief executive, ITC. For services to broadcasting.
 Michael David Ross. Chief executive, Scottish Widows. For services to the financial sector in Scotland. 
 Philip Charles Ruffles, FRS. Director, Engineering and Technology, Rolls-Royce plc. For services to the aerospace and defence industries. 
 Mrs Philippa Margaret Russell, OBE. Director, Council for Disabled Children. For services to disabled children and adults.
 Mrs Lucianne Sawyer. President, UK Home Care Association. For services to health care.
 Richard Gilbert Saxon. Chairman, Building Design Partnership. For services to construction procurement.
 Professor Peter John Selby. Director of Clinical Research, Imperial Cancer Research Fund. For services to cancer research and cancer care.
 Philip Edward Sellers. For services to accountancy and audit. 
 Professor Robert William Ernest Shannon. For services to economic development.
 Samuel James Shields. For services to health care.
 Judge Ramesh Singh. Commissioner for Racial Equality, Wales. For services to race equality.
 Joseph Brian Smith. For public service.
 Professor Peter George Smith. London School of Hygiene and Tropical Medicine. For services to the Spongiform Encephalopathy Advisory Committee and to tropical disease research. 
 Professor Peter Ian Stanley. Lately chief executive, Central Science Laboratory, Ministry of Agriculture, Fisheries and Food.
 Professor Elan Closs Stephens. Professor of Communications and Creative Industries, University of Aberystwyth. For services to the Welsh language.
 Graham Spencer Stirling. Lately chairman, Prosper. For services to education and training in Devon and Cornwall.
 Professor Nigel Clement Halley Stott. For services to primary care and general practice medicine. 
 Professor Joan Kathleen Stringer. Principal and vice-patron, Queen Margaret University College. For services to higher education. 
 William Taylor, QPM. HM Chief Inspector of Constabulary, Scotland. For services to the police.
 Professor Charles Tomlinson. Poet. For services to literature. 
 Ivor Ward. Lately head, Personnel Management Group, HM Prison Service, Home Office.
 Alan Watson. Deputy Parliamentary Commissioner for Administration.
 Professor Hubert Frank Woods. For services to the Committee on Toxicity of Chemicals in Food, Consumer Products and the Environment.
 James Robertson Graeme Wright, DL. Lately Vice-Chancellor, University of Newcastle upon Tyne. For services to higher education.
Diplomatic and overseas
 Dr Cynthia Ruth Butlin. For services to the eradication of leprosy in India and Nepal. 
 Albray Victor Butterfield, MBE. For services to the community, Providenciales. 
 John Charles Galliano. Fashion Designer. For services to the fashion industry. 
 Neil Trevor Kaplan, QC. For services to international arbitration. 
 Robert Charles Lane. For services to British commercial and legal interests overseas. 
 Donald Malpas, OBE. For services to the British community, São Paulo. 
 Dudley Stuart John Moore. For services to Anglo-American film and theatre. 
 Professor Simon Michael Schama. For services to history and art criticism. 
 Dr Keith Mortimer Waddell, MBE. For services to the blind in Uganda. 
 Googie Withers (Mrs. John McCallum), A.O. For services to British theatre, film and television. 
 Theodore Zeldin. For services to literature and Anglo-French relations.

Officer of the Order of the British Empire (OBE)
Barbara, Mrs. Ainger, lately Chief Executive, The Housing Finance Corporation. For services to Housing.
Christopher Charles Kennedy Albiston. For services to the Police.
Mohammed Ali, Founder, Quest for Economic Development (QED). For services to South Asian communities.
Peter Riddle Allan, D. L. For services to the community, especially Business and Employment, in North East England.
Frank Amadedon. For services to Community Relations in Wolverhampton.
David Stuart Archbold. For services to the Transport Industry.
Allan Arnott, lately Chair, Greater Peterborough TEC/ CCTE. For services to Lifelong Learning.
Professor Bernard Atkinson, Member, BBSRC Council. For services to Biotechnology.
John Barrie Atkinson, J.P. For services to the Magistrates’ Courts Service.
Peter William Avery, Fellow of King's College, University of Cambridge. For services to Oriental Studies.
Peter Badejo, Director, Badejo Arts. For services to Dance.
Harry James Banks. For services to Coal Mining and to the community in County Durham.
Brigadier Neil Barclay. For services to the Army Benevolent Fund in Shropshire.
Professor Lorraine Florence Baric, Professorial Fellow, University of Salford. For services to Electricity Consumers.
John Edward Barnes, lately Health Emergency Planning Adviser, South East Regional Office, Department of Health.
Geoffrey Grant Fulton Barnett. For services to Voluntary Service Overseas.
Professor Robin Michael Basker. For services to Dental Education.
Mary Elizabeth, Mrs. La Trobe-Bateman, Director, Contemporary Applied Arts. For services to Crafts. 
Syed Nawazish Bokhari, Principal, Ernest Bevin College, Tooting, London. For services to Education. 
John Garfield Bourke. For services to the Probation Service.
Geoffrey William Breeden, Community Fire Safety Officer. For services to the Fire Service and to Young People.
Michael Francis Brennan, lately Head, Adoption Section, Department of Health.
David Brodie, Founder Director, TaxAid. For services to Low Income Taxpayers.
Robert Bruce Knight Broughton, Welsh Secretary, British Medical Association in Wales. For services to Medicine.
Patrick Dominic Bryon, Lead Assessor, National Professional Qualification for Headship. For services to Education in Wales.
Beatrice May, Mrs. Burgess, Chair, Babies in Prison. For services to Prisoner Welfare.
Hugh Thomas Burnett. For services to the community in Newhaven, East Sussex.
David Edward Church. For services to the Richmond Society, Surrey.
David Hamilton Clark, Director, Research and Innovation, EPSRC. For services to Research. 
Malcolm Brian Clark, lately Director, Queen Elizabeth's Foundation for Disabled People. For services to Disabled People.
Rodney Jeremy Clark, lately Chief Executive, Sense. For services to Deafblind People.
Leslie Clegg. For services to the Footwear Industry and to the community in Bacup, Lancashire.
Simon Paul Clegg, Chief Executive, British Olympic Association. For services to Sport.
Christine Mackenzie, Mrs. Cohen, Chairman, Hampstead Heath Management Committee. For services to City Open Spaces.
John Coleman, Director, Trust for the Study of Adolescence. For services to Youth Justice.
Ms Pauline Collins (Mrs. Alderton), Actress. For services to Drama.
Howard John Cooper. For services to Farriery and Equine Welfare.
Dorothy Patricia, Mrs. Copland. For services to Education and to Charities on the Isle of Man.
John Frederick Corrin, Headteacher, Wensleydale Middle School, Blyth, Northumberland. For services to Education.
Martin Courtis, Member, Radioactive Waste Management Advisory Committee. For services to Environmental Protection.
Professor Margaret Josephine Cox, Professor of Information Technology in Education, King's College London. For services to Education.
Milton Fitzroy Crosdale, Director, Nottingham and District Racial Equality Council. For services to Equal Opportunities.
Barry Cryer, Writer and Broadcaster. For services to Comedy Drama.
Peter John Dawe, Founder and Trustee, Dawe Charitable Trust. For services to the Internet Watch Foundation.
Miss Joanne Denney, Chief Executive, Institute of Grocery Distribution. For services to the Food and Grocery Trade.
David Michael Dixon, General Medical Practitioner and Chair, NHS Alliance. For services to Primary Health Care.
Miss Kate Doherty. For services to Education.
Mark Dowd, Chair, Mersey Travel. For services to Public Transport.
Dennis Hathaway Drysdale, J.P. For services to the Hampshire Probation Committee and Board. 
Marjorie, Mrs. Durie, lately Director, Service Development, Ayrshire and Arran Health Board. For services to Nursing and to the NHS.
Graham Patrick Dyer, Museum Curator, Royal Mint. 
Elizabeth Dorothy, Mrs. Earnshaw. For services to Golf.
William Glyndwr Edmunds, Principal, Deeside College, Flintshire. For services to Further Education.
Peter Brian Elliott, Chairman, Governing Body, Northumberland College. For services to Further Education.
Martin John Ellis. Grade B2, Defence Procurement Agency, Ministry of Defence.
John Evans, Assistant Director, H.M. Board of Inland Revenue.
John Daniel Evans, Founder, Hampshire Centre for Independent Living. For services to Disabled People. 
Anne Margaret, Mrs. Everall, Director, Young Readers UK. For services to Children's Librarianship in Birmingham.
Diana Jacqueline, Mrs. Farragher, Physiotherapy Teacher. For services to the Treatment of Chronic Facial Paralysis.
Danny Fellows, Chairman, West Wales TEC. For services to Training and Employment.
John Lloret Fells, Detective Inspector, National Criminal Intelligence Service. For services to the Police.
Henry George Fetherstonhaugh. For services to the Forestry Commission.
Professor Charles Arthur Fewson, Professor of Microbial Biochemistry, University of Glasgow. For services to Biological Science.
Maureen, Mrs. Foers, Founder, Northern Business Centre (Humber) Ltd. For services to Small Business in Humberside.
Colin Hamish Forsyth, lately General Dental Practitioner, Rutland. For services to Dental Care for Prisoners.
Professor Robert Stewart Fowler, lately Principal and Chief Executive, Central School of Speech and Drama. For services to Higher Education.
Ernst Fraenkel, Chairman, Wiener Library. For services to Holocaust Scholarship.
Keith Bertram Francis, Divisional Manager, Administrative Support and Estates Management, Office for Standards in Education.
Thomas Michael Freeman, lately Chief Executive, Horizon NHS Trust, Hertfordshire. For services to People with Learning Disabilities.
Philip Albert Friend, Equal Opportunities and Disability Consultant. For services to People with Disabilities. 
Miss Susan Garland (Mrs. Worthington), Deputy chief executive, British Tourist Authority. For services to Tourism.
Miss Pauline Gaunt, Head, Transport Bill Co-ordination Team, Department of the Environment, Transport and the Regions.
Anil Gholkar, Consultant Neuro-radiologist, Newcastle upon Tyne Hospitals NHS Trust. For services to Neurology.
Robin Warwick Gibson, Chief Curator, National Portrait Gallery. For services to Museums.
Trevor Greenwood. For services to Education. 
Professor Robert James Gurney, Director, NERC Environmental Systems Science Centre, University of Reading. For services to Earth Observation and to Environmental Science.
John Guy, Principal, Farnborough Sixth Form College, Hampshire. For services to Education.
Clifford Hardcastle. For services to the community, especially Education, in South East London.
David Wynne Harding, Grade B1, Ministry of Defence. 
John Richard Harris, Senior Executive, McCain Foods (GB) Ltd. For services to the Potato Processing Industry.
Derek Alfred Heasman, Headteacher, Dollis Junior School, Mill Hill, London. For services to Education. 
John David Hebblethwaite, Secretary, Liturgical Commission. For services to the Church of England. 
Martin Henry. For services to Export and to Business. 
Peter Hollis, Headteacher, Oaklands Community School, Southampton, Hampshire. For services to Education.
Paul Hopkins, Headteacher, St. Gabriel's RC High School, Bury, Lancashire. For services to Education. 
David Kingsley Hyland, Special Casework Lawyer, Crown Prosecution Service.
Doris, Mrs. Ingham. For services to the Women's Section, Royal British Legion.
Miss Marjorie Elizabeth Jackson, Executive Nurse Director. For services to Health Care in London. 
Colin Leslie Jones, lately Secretary, Welsh Local Government Association. For services to Local Government.
Professor Dylan Marc Jones, Professor, School of Psychology, University of Cardiff. For services to Military Science.
Margaret Anne, Mrs. Jones, lately Chief Executive, Brook. For services to Family Planning.
Richard Owen Phillips Jones, Head, Amman Valley School, Ammanford. For services to Education.
Professor Peter Ignaz Paul Kalmus. For services to Physics.
Kartar Singh Kathuria, Executive Member and Treasurer, Kirklees Racial Equality Council. For services to Ethnic Minority Communities in Huddersfield and Kirklees, West Yorkshire.
Maurice Kench, lately Chairman, Royal United Kingdom Beneficent Association. For charitable services to Elderly People.
David William Andrew Kerr. For public service. 
Professor Richard Ian Kitney, Professor of Biomedical Systems Engineering, Imperial College London. For services to IT in Health Care.
Marie, Mrs. Knott, Clinical Nurse Specialist, Kendray Hospital, Barnsley. For services to Health Care for Elderly People.
Ms Zara Lamont, Director, Construction Best Practice Programme. For services to the Construction Industry. 
Carol Alison, Mrs. Laws, Headteacher, Wheatfields Junior School, St. Albans Hertfordshire. For services to the Promotion of ‘Safer Routes’ for School Journeys.
Josephine, Mrs. Laycock, Physiotherapist. For services to Incontinence Care.
Albert Barry Leese, Managing Director, Epichem Ltd. For services to the Defence Industry.
George Moir Leslie, Managing Director, George Leslie Ltd. For services to Civil Engineering and Construction.
Valerie Ellen, Mrs. Le Valliant, lately Director, Jones Lang LaSalle. For services to Architecture and to the community in East London.
Ronald William Lofthouse, lately Vice Chairman, Merseyside TEC. For services to Training.
Norman Ralph Lowe. Managing Director, Enviro Consulting. For services to the Water Industry and to Environmental Protection.
Roger Clark Lowry. For charitable services to Health Care.
John Archie Macaskill, Chairman, Crofters’ Commission. For services to the Highlands and to Crofting.
Miss Sheena MacFarlane, International Vice President, Girls’ Brigade. For services to the Girls’ Brigade. 
Henrietta, Mrs. Maciver, Chief Executive, Turning Point Scotland. For services to Women Offenders and Drug Misusers.
Colonel Robert Hugh MacKeith. For services to the Cadet Forces.
Angus Alexander MacKenzie. For services to Health Charities in the Highlands.
Gordon David Mackenzie, Headteacher, Balwearie High School, Kirkcaldy. For services to Secondary Education.
David Madden. For services to the Police.
Gilbert Madley. For services to the Royal Air Forces Association in North West England.
Mohinder Singh Mahi, Grade 7, OFTEL, Department of Trade and Industry.
Anne Mary, Mrs. Mallinson, J.P. For services to the community in London.
Patrick Gerald Mallon. For public service.
Terence Michael Mason, J.P. For services to the Berkshire Association of Young People.
Nicholas David Maurice. For services to OXFAM. 
John Joseph Anthony McCann, Deputy Collector, H.M. Board of Customs and Excise.
James Allan McColl, Chairman, Clyde Blowers plc. For services to the Engineering Industry.
Kevin McCormack, lately President, Justices’ Clerks’ Society. For services to the Criminal Justice System. 
Douglas Christopher Patrick McDougall. For services to Financial Services Regulation.
Michael Anthony McFarlane. For services to Athletics and to the Duke of Edinburgh's Award.
Seamus McGarvey, Business and Quality Adviser, H.M. Board of Inland Revenue.
John Charles McGinnis. For services to the Construction Industry.
George McGregor, lately Director of Estates, Greater Glasgow Primary Health Services NHS Trust. For services to the NHS.
Catherine Margaret, Mrs. McMahon, Road Safety Research Co-ordinator, Department of the Environment, Transport and the Regions.
Henry Campbell McMurray, Director, Royal Naval Museum, Ministry of Defence.
Professor Jane Millar. For services to Social Policy Research.
Christopher Gregory Michael Mills. For services to the Textile Industry.
John Francis Brake Mitchell, Grade JL1, Meteorological Office, Ministry of Defence.
Peter Morgan, lately Deputy Director in Wales, Employment Service, Department for Education and Employment.
Roger Thomas Thorpe Morgan. For services to Young People in Care.
John Walker Motson. For services to Sports Broadcasting.
Walter Mowbray, Prison Service Budget Manager, H.M. Prison Service, Home Office.
Henry Murdoch, Chairman, Environment and Land Use Committee, National Farmers’ Union of Scotland. For services to Agriculture.
Rosemary, Mrs. Murphy, Chief Executive, National Day Nurseries Association. For services to Early Years Education.
Jurat Barbara (Mrs.) Myles. For services to the community in Jersey.
Andrew Nelson, Executive Chairman, IQE. For services to the Electronics Industry.
Roy Noble, Radio Presenter. For services to the community and to Charities in Wales.
Humphrey Thomas Norrington. For charitable services.
Michael Gordon Noyland, Assistant Director, H.M. Board of Inland Revenue.
Antony Stuart Nunn, Marine Underwriter. For services to the Marine Insurance Industry.
Derek Charles Oakey, Head, Branch B, Criminal Justice Division, Lord Chancellor's Department.
Robin Francis Leigh Oakley. For services to Political Journalism.
Ben Okri, Writer. For services to Literature.
Hugh Stephen Roden Orde, Deputy Assistant Commissioner, Metropolitan Police Service. For services to the Police.
Miss Linda Ormiston, Opera Singer. For services to Opera.
Wayne Otto. For services to Karate.
David Andrew Arlwydd Owen, Chief Executive, Medical Research Council Technology. For services to Medical Research and Technology Transfer.
Peter Craig Paisley. For services to Local Government and to the community in Glasgow.
William Brian Parker, Principal Community Education Officer, Coventry, West Midlands. For services to Education.
Professor Christine Pascal, Chair, Early Childhood Education, Centre for Research in Early Childhood, University College Worcester. For services to Early Years Education.
Ms Naina Patel, Founder of Policy Research Institute on Aging and Ethnicity (PRIAE), For services to ethnic minority elderly in the UK and Europe.
Meena, Mrs. Pathak, Product Developer, Patak Spices. For services to the Food Industry.
Ann, Mrs. Payne, lately Head of Manuscripts, British Library. For services to Manuscripts Scholarship.
Fiona Natalie, Mrs. Peel, Chair, Gwent Health Authority. For services to the NHS.
Ms Arlene Phillips, Choreographer. For services to Dance.
John Leigh Phillips. For services to Agriculture in Wales.
Miss Sally Joyce Phillips. For services to Family Planning Services in Cornwall.
Anne, Mrs. Pigott. For services to the National Association of Prison Visitors.
John Joseph Pike, lately Chair, Greater Nottingham TEC. For services to Education and Training.
Peter David Poore. For services to Save the Children. 
Colin Preece, Accountant, House of Lords.
John Stephen Rowland Pugh, Head, Business Services Division, Health and Safety Executive, Department of the Environment, Transport and the Regions. 
Christine, Mrs. Reid, Member, North Wiltshire District Council. For services to Local Government.
Anne Barbara, Mrs. Ridler, Author. For services to Literature.
John Finbar Riordan, Medical Director, North West London Hospitals Trust. For services to Medical Management.
Professor Lewis Duthie Ritchie. For services to General Practice and Primary Care Medicine in Scotland. 
Colonel Alan Clive Roberts, M.B.E., D.L. For services to the community in Leeds, West Yorkshire.
Dennis Arthur Roberts. For services to the Royal Star and Garter Home.
Anna, Mrs. Robertson. For services to the British Red Cross Society in Devon.
Edward Heron Robson, Director, Teaching Company Directorate. For services to Competitiveness.
Ms Yvonne Rose, Governor, East Yorkshire College, East Yorkshire. For services to Further Education. 
Richard Henry Sedgwick, Grade 7, Benefits Agency, Department of Social Security.
David Shakespeare, Leader, Buckinghamshire County Council. For services to Local Government.
Alan Shearer. For services to Association Football. 
Lilias Mulgrave, Mrs. Sheepshanks. For services to the Royal Hospital School, Holbrook.
Sylvia, Mrs. Sheridan, Founder, Independent Media Support Ltd. For services to Broadcasting.
Arnold Joseph Simanowitz. For services to Victims of Medical Accidents.
The Very Reverend Colin Bruce Slee, Dean of Southwark. For services to the community.
Andrea Pamela, Mrs. Smith, Chair, Lincolnshire Careers Guidance Services. For services to Training.
Brian Smith, Chief Executive, Lite-On Ltd. For services to Education and Training.
John Louis Charles Raymond Shurmer Smith, Dean, faculty of the Environment, University of Portsmouth. For services to Higher Education.
Mary Catherine, Mrs. Smith, Founder Member and lately Chair, Knowle West Against Drugs. For services to the community in Knowle West, Bristol.
Ian Alexander Snedden, Head, Fire Services and Emergency Planning Division, Scottish Executive. 
Ms Susan Sommers, Outreach Services Manager, Thames Reach Housing Association. For services to Homeless People in London.
William Howard Speirs. For services to Trade Relations with China.
Ian Stark, M.B.E. For services to Equestrian Sport. 
Roger Stephenson. For services to Architecture.
John Watt Stevenson, Chairman, Scottish Dental Practice Board. For services to NHS Dental Services in Scotland.
Ms Moira Stuart, Presenter, BBC. For services to News Broadcasting.
Carolyn, Mrs. Swain, lately Principal Manager, Qualifications and Curriculum Authority. For services to Education.
Alan William Taylor, Area Director, H.M. Board of Inland Revenue.
Eric Raymond Taylor, Chairman, Rehab Scotland. For services to the Rehabilitation of People with Disabilities.
John Taylor, Director, European Supply Chain, Unilever. For services to the Chemical Industry.
John Pearce Thackray, Managing Director, Kapitex Healthcare Ltd. For services to the Health Care Industry.
Neil Thomason, Senior Civil Servant, Ministry of Defence.
Bernard Tidball, Editorial Supervisor of the Vote, House of Commons.
Anthony George Merrik, Lord Tryon, D.L. For services to the Salisbury Cathedral Trust.
Christopher Paul Turner, Principal, Brixham Community College, Devon. For services to Education.
Kenneth Vowles, Executive Director, UK Power Operations, Scottish Power. For services to the Electricity Industry.
Robert James Walker, Director of Operations, Scottish Fisheries Protection Agency, Scottish Executive. 
David McDonald Warren. For services to the North Highland College and to the community in Thurso, Caithness.
William Ernest Warren, Head, Intelligent Client Services, PACE, H.M. Treasury.
Robert Andrew Watson. For services to the Meat Industry.
Robert Drennan Watson, Founding Chairman, Scottish Environment Link. For services to Environmental Management.
Dermot Roger Marriott Weatherup. For services to Heritage Preservation.
Hubert Maurice William Weedon, Guitarist. For services to Music.
David Charles Whalley. For services to Regeneration in Barnsley, South Yorkshire.
Ms Kate Whiteford, Artist. For services to Art.
The Reverend Canon David John Whittington. For services to the community in Stockton-on-Tees.
Julia, Mrs. Whybrew, Personnel Officer, ES Directorate, Department of Trade and Industry.
John Widdrington, Business Manager, Vickers Defence Systems. For services to the Defence Industry. 
Michael Anthony Widdrington, Senior Assembly Counsel, National Assembly for Wales.
John Arthur Wilkinson. For services to the community in Salford, Greater Manchester.
Dennis Sidney Cyril Williams, Grade B2, Defence Procurement Agency, Ministry of Defence.
Elisabeth Evan, Mrs. Williams, J.P. For services to the Administration of Justice in North East England. 
Peter James Wilson, Director, Projects and Estates, Tate Gallery. For services to Museums.
Professor Thomas Black Wilson, Principal, Glasgow College of Building and Printing. For services to Further Education.
William Thompson Wright. For services to Industry and to the community.
Keith Dunckley Yates, Chief Executive, Stirling Council. For services to Local Government.
Paul Young, Chief Fire Officer, Devon Fire and Rescue Service. For services to the Fire Service.
Peter Andrew Young, Deputy Director and Chief Scientist, Home Office.

Member of the Order of the British Empire (MBE)
Gerry Anderson. For services to Animation.
Miss Chi-chi Nwanoku. Double bass player. For services to music.
Francis Wheeler. For services to Public Transport Pensioners.

The Commonwealth

Bahamas

Order Of St Michael And St George

Knight Commander (K.C.M.G.)

Arthur Alexander Foulkes. For services to politics, diplomacy and journalism.

Companions of the St Michael and St George (C.M.G.)

Wendell Godfrey Major. For public service.
Norman Solomon. For service to the business community.

Order of the British Empire

Commander of the Order of the British Empire (C.B.E.)

Senator The Honourable Lynn Holowesko. For services to the law and the environment.

Officers of the Order of the British Empire (O.B.E.)

Bishop Roston Livingston Davis. For service to religion and the community.
Arnold Robinson (Jack) Knowles. For service to the insurance industry.
George James Mosko. For service to the construction industry.
The Reverend Charles Andrew Sweeting. For service to religion and the community.

Members of the Order of the British Empire (M.B.E.)

Paula, Mrs. Poitier-Darcy. For services to education. 
Violet, Mrs. Esfakis. For service to the community. 
Ruth Agnes, Mrs. Granger. For services to education. 
Naomi Amelia, Mrs. Lockhart. For services to education.
Dr. Mary Priscilla Ritchie. For services to health. 
William Weeks. For services to the community. 
Hubert Wong. For services to business.

British Empire Medal (B.E.M.)

Patrick Gomez, J.P. For services to tourism and public transport.
Dr. Corolyn Leona Hanna. For services to education. 
Willis Lindberg Harding. For service to the community. 
Walter Otnell Laing. For service to the hospitality industry.
William Earl Lightbourne. For services to education. 
Eldica Theresa, Mrs. Moss. For service to the community.
Ms Edith Christine Rolle. For public service. 
Anderson Stuart Stratton. For service to the community

Queen's Police Medal (Q.P.M.)

Reginald Ferguson, Royal Bahamas Police Force. 
John Sidney Rolle, Royal Bahamas Police Force.

Barbados

Order Of The British Empire

Commander of the Order of the British Empire (C.B.E.)

The Reverend William George Dixon. For services to religion.

Officer of the Order of the British Empire (O.B.E.)

Woodbine Augustus Davis, Q.C., J.P. For services to the law.

Members of the Order of the British Empire (M.B.E.)

Miss Eugene Aquinda Daniel. For services to St. John Ambulance Brigade.

Belize

Member of the Order of the British Empire (M.B.E.)

Jose Asevedo. For services to education.

Grenada

Order Of The British Empire

Commander of the Order of the British Empire (C.B.E.)

Sister Gabrielle Mason. For services to education.

Member of the Order of the British Empire (M.B.E.)

Hudson James McPhail. For services to education.

British Empire Medal (B.E.M.)

Lennard Augustine. For services to the fishing industry. 
Thomas Benjamin. For services to the farming industry.
Paul McIntosh. For services to the farming industry. 
James Sylvester. For services to the farming industry.

Papua New Guinea

Order of St Michael and St George

Companions of the Order of St Michael and St George (C.M.G.)

The Honourable Michael Ogio, C.B.E., M.P. For services to politics.
The Right Reverend Albert Toburua, O.B.E. For services to the church and community.

Order of the British Empire

Knight Commander of the Order of the British Empire (K.B.E.)

James Murdo Fraser. For public service..

Commanders of the Order of the British Empire (C.B.E.)

Beno Bartholomew Tomon Boeha. For services to higher education and research.
John Luke Crittin. For services to business and the community.
Leo Meninga. For public service.

Officers of the Order of the British Empire (O.B.E.)

Benson Gegeyo. For Public service.
Councillor Nambuka Mara. For service to the community.
Bishop Laka Renagi. For service to the church and community.
Dennis Renton. For public service.
Justice Gibbs Salika. For service to the judiciary. 
Henry Hung Tse. For service to business and the community.

Members of the Order of the British Empire (M.B.E.)

Joseph Diunde Kama. For service to the community. 
Valentine Kambori. For service to agriculture. 
George Karaliyo. For service to the community. 
Clarence Kewani. For public service.
Ms Margaret Lavutul. For services to women's affairs and the community.
Minty, Mrs. Mae. For services to the judiciary. 
Damien Miti. For services to sport and education. 
Benny Borrom Popoital. For services to banking. 
John Elipa Pun. For services to politics.
Mathew Numambo Siune. For services to politics. 
David Sode. For public service.
Peter Dalton Woolcott. For service to business. 
Sydney George Yates. For services to sports and business.

Members of the Order of the British Empire (Military) (M.B.E.)

Lieutenant Colonel David Johnny, Papua New Guinea Defence Force.
Lieutenant Colonel Daniel Kipo, Papua New Guinea Defence Force.

British Empire Medal (B.E.M)

Goodwill Tony Amos. For services to forestry. 
Councillor Jack Hole Angual. For service to the community.
John Banama. For public service.
Pastor Sepo Koti. For service to the church and community.
Kume Krai. For service to government.
Charles Kose Mero. For service to the community. 
Linda Joyce, Mrs. Naembo. For service to the public. 
Ms Poseiap Popau. For services to policing.
Mel, Mrs. Puri. For public service.
Kwalam Tangapi. For service to government. 
Kalale Wel. For service to the community.

British Empire Medal (Military) (B.E.M.)

Sergeant Angus Aigilo, Papua New Guinea Defence Force.
Sergeant James Komae, Papua New Guinea Defence Force.
Warrant Officer Wamaope Tamaeo, Papua New Guinea Defence Force.
Sergeant Tapu Waku, Papua New Guinea Defence Force.

Saint Christopher and Nevis

Order Of St Michael and St George

Companion of the Order of St Michael and St George (C.M.G.)
Edmond St John Payne. For public service.

Order Of The British Empire

Officer of the Order of the British Empire (O.B.E.)

Dr. Bertram Lincoln Charles. For public service.

British Empire Medal (B.E.M)
Josephine Madrie, Mrs. Alexander. For services to the community.
Ms Annie Clairmont. For services to the community.
Victor Langelier Perineau. For services to the community.
Ms Jane Plummer. For services to the community. 
Vivius Raymond. For services to the community.

Saint Lucia

Order Of St Michael and St George

Companion of the Order of St Michael and St George (C.M.G.)

Frederick Nicholas Paul Devaux. For services to business and commerce.

Order Of The British Empire

Officers of the Order of the British Empire (O.B.E.)

Michael Thomas Chastenet. For services to business, commerce and tourism.
Eldon Cornibert Mathurin. For public service.

Members of the Order of the British Empire (M.B.E.)

Monica, Mrs. Alcide. For services to the community.
Johnson Flannan Cenac. For services to the public and the community.
Julius Drysdale. For services to sports development and the public
Augustina Florence, Mrs. Lastic. For services to the community.

British Empire Medal (B.E.M)

Josephine Madrie, Mrs. Alexander. For services to the community.
Ms Annie Clairmont. For services to the community.
Victor Langelier Perineau. For services to the community.
Ms Jane Plummer. For services to the community. 
Vivius Raymond. For services to the community.

Saint Vincent

Order Of The British Empire

Knights Commander of the Order of the British Empire (K.B.E.)

Kenneth Dwight Vincent Venner, C.B.E. For services to the financial sector.

Solomon Islands

Knight Bachelor

The Honourable Allan Kemakeza. For services to policing and politics.

Order Of The British Empire

Officer of the Order of the British Empire (O.B.E.)

The Most Reverend Amos Stanley Waiaru. For services to the community and politics.

Member of the Order of the British Empire (M.B.E.)

William Leslie Miki. For services to the community and the judiciary.

Tuvalu

Order Of The British Empire

Officer of the Order of the British Empire (O.B.E.)

Elisala Pita. For public and community service.

Members of the Order of the British Empire (M.B.E.)

Baueri Irata. For public and community service. 
Melitagi, Mrs. Lifuka. For public and community service
Peifaga Pita. For public and community service.

British Empire Medal (B.E.M.)

Valoaga Fonotapu. For services to the community. 
Vaiefa Mafoa, Mrs. Lui. For public and community service.
Naniseni Tovia. For services to the community.

Australia

New Zealand

References

Birthday Honours
2001 awards in the United Kingdom
2001 awards